Pedobacter is a genus of Gram-negative soil-associated bacteria. Species including Pedobacter heparinus, formerly known as Flavobacterium heparinum, produce heparinase and are capable of using heparin as their sole carbon and nitrogen source.

In molecular biology, Pedobacter has also been identified as a contaminant of DNA extraction kit reagents and ultra-pure water systems, which may lead to its erroneous appearance in microbiota or metagenomic datasets.

Species
Pedobacter africanus
Pedobacter agri
Pedobacter alluvionis
Pedobacter arcticus
Pedobacter borealis
Pedobacter cryoconitis
Pedobacter ginsengisoli
Pedobacter heparinus
Pedobacter insulae
Pedobacter jejuensis
Pedobacter lentus
Pedobacter lusitanus
Pedobacter nyackensis
Pedobacter rhizosphaerae
Pedobacter saltans
Pedobacter soli
Pedobacter terricola

References

Further reading

Sphingobacteriia
Bacteria genera